Trinidad de Copán is a municipality in the Honduran department of Copán.

According to the 2001 census, it had a population of 5,816.

Municipalities of the Copán Department